Xylosma serpentinum is a species of flowering plant in the family Salicaceae. It is endemic to New Caledonia.

References

Endemic flora of New Caledonia
serpentina
Vulnerable plants
Taxa named by Hermann Otto Sleumer
Taxonomy articles created by Polbot